George Coleman Poage (November 6, 1880 – April 11, 1962) was an American track and field athlete. He was the first black and the first African-American athlete to win a medal in the Olympic Games, winning two bronze medals at the 1904 games in St. Louis.

Biography

Early life
Born in Hannibal, Missouri, his family moved to La Crosse, Wisconsin in 1884. After his father, James, died in 1888, George Poage, along with his mother and surviving sibling, moved into the home of Mary and Lucian Easton; Lucian was the son of local lumberman Jason Easton, who employed James in his stables.

At La Crosse High School Poage excelled as both a student and an athlete; he was considered the top athlete at the school and, in 1899, was the class salutatorian, becoming the school's first African-American graduate.

College and Olympic years
The following fall he became a freshman at the University of Wisconsin. After competing with the freshman track squad in 1900, he joined the varsity track and field team during his sophomore year. Poage was the first black athlete to run for UW, specializing in the short sprints and hurdles. A consistent point winner for his team, he quickly became well respected. When the track coach was called out of town in 1902, he placed Poage in charge of the team in his absence.

Poage graduated in 1903 with a degree in History. His senior thesis was titled "An Investigation into the Economic Condition of the Negro in the State of Georgia During the Period of 1860–1900". He returned to the University for the 1903–04 school year to take graduate classes in History, supported by the UW athletic department, which hired him as an athletic trainer for the football team. In June 1904, he became the first African-American individual Big Ten track champion in conference history, placing first in both the 440-yard dash and the 220-yard hurdles.

The Milwaukee Athletic Club sponsored Poage to compete in the 1904 Summer Olympics in St. Louis, Missouri. Many prominent African-American leaders had called for a boycott of the games to protest racial segregation of the events in St. Louis. An integrated audience was not allowed at either the Olympics or the World's Fair as the organizers had built segregated facilities for the spectators. Poage chose to compete in four events and became the first black and the first African-American to medal in the Games by winning the bronze in both the 200-yard and 400-yard hurdles.

Later years
Poage remained in St. Louis after the Olympics, working as a school principal for a year before becoming a teacher at segregated Charles Sumner High School. At Sumner, he was the head of the English department, teaching English composition, literature, and Latin, helped coach the school’s sports teams, and supervised various extracurricular activities such as debate and theater.  In 1914, Poage left his job at Sumner. According to a former student, he purchased a farm in Minnesota, although no land records of the purchase have been found. Local historian Margaret Lichter and Bruce Mouser have speculated that the land was owned by the Easton family.

In 1920, Poage moved to Chicago. He worked in a restaurant for four years.  In 1924, Poage was hired by the United States Postal Service and worked as a postal clerk for nearly thirty years. After his retirement in the 1950s he remained in Chicago until his death in 1962.

Legacy
Poage was elected to the Wisconsin Athletic Hall of Fame in 1998.

In 2013, the La Crosse City Council renamed Hood Park to George C. Poage Park in Poage's honor.

References

1880 births
1962 deaths
African-American male track and field athletes
University of Wisconsin–Madison alumni
American male sprinters
American male hurdlers
Athletes (track and field) at the 1904 Summer Olympics
People from Hannibal, Missouri
Sportspeople from La Crosse, Wisconsin
Medalists at the 1904 Summer Olympics
Olympic bronze medalists for the United States in track and field
20th-century African-American people